Nicolas Moussiopoulos (in Greek Νικόλαος Μουσιόπουλος, born January 1, 1956, in Athens) is a Greek engineer and university professor at the Aristotle University of Thessaloniki. His research interests are in the field of Environmental Engineering.

Early life and education
Moussiopoulos studied mechanical engineering at the Universität Karlsruhe (now Karlsruhe Institute of Technology, KIT), from 1973 to 1978 and, prior to graduating, had a research stay at the Von Karman Institute of Fluid Mechanics in Sint-Genesius-Rode, Belgium. After completing his doctoral studies in 1982 with a focus on transport phenomena, he started lecturing at the Universität Karlsruhe, where he led a research group that developed mathematical model systems to describe air pollutant dispersion and transformation. From 1986 to 1987 he also worked as a lecturer at the Gesamthochschule of Kassel. After the completion of his postdoctoral lecture qualification (“Habilitation”), he was appointed Full Professor at the School of Mechanical Engineering of the Aristotle University of Thessaloniki. Since 1990 he is also the head of this university's Sustainability Engineering Laboratory, formerly Laboratory of Heat Transfer and Environmental Engineering. In addition, since 1996 he is a Honorary Professor at KIT's School of Mechanical Engineering.

Career
In the periods 1997-1999 and 2003–2007, Moussiopoulos chaired Aristotle University's School of Mechanical Engineering. From September 2006 until August 2010 he was the Dean of the University's Faculty of Engineering. From October 2010 until March 2016 he served as the Vice President of the International Hellenic University and Dean of its School of Economics & Business Administration (until 2013). In the periods 2014-2017 and 2019-2021 he was also the Head of the Energy Department, School of Mechanical Engineering of the Aristotle University Thessaloniki.

Moussiopoulos has consulted several Greek ministers, and represented Greece in numerous international committees<.  Since 2002 he is a member of the German National Academy of Sciences Leopoldina. In the same year he was awarded the Order of Merit of the Federal Republic of Germany. In 2012 the Royal Society appointed him associate editor of Philosophical Transactions A, the world's longest running scientific journal. In the period 2015-2018, Moussiopoulos was the General Secretary of the Hellenic Chapter of the Club of Rome. From June 2018 until April 2021 he was an elected member of the Scientific Council of the Hellenic Foundation for Research and Innovation, responsible for Engineering and Technology Sciences. August 2019 he was appointed consultant to the German Federal Ministry for Economic Cooperation and Development on waste management issues in Greece. Since October 2021 he is elected Vice President of the Hellenic Solid Waste Management Association, responsible for international relations. He received the Gerhard Hess Award of the German Research Association, the Heinrich Hertz Award (1990) and Aristotle University's Excellence Prize (2008).

Academy membership
Full member of the German National Academy of Sciences Leopoldina, Engineering Sciences Section, since 2002.

Selected publications

References 

1956 births
Academic staff of the Aristotle University of Thessaloniki
Engineers from Athens
Living people
Recipients of the Cross of the Order of Merit of the Federal Republic of Germany
Environmental engineers